The World Martial Arts Masterships is an international martial arts competition that has been held in the North Chungcheong Province, South Korea. A total of 2 masterships have been held, with the 2016 iteration being held in Cheongju, and the 2019 competition being held in Chungju.

Background 
The World Combat Games were founded by Global Association of International Sports Federations (then known as SportAccord) with the first rendition being held in Beijing, China in 2010. The 2013 rendition was then held in St. Petersburg, Russia. Following the demise of SportAccord due to conflicts with the International Olympic Committee after the 2013 games, the World Combat Games were halted. The World Martial Arts Masterships Committee was then created to continue the idea of a martial arts-only multi-sport event.

Games

Online Games
http://online.mastership.org/en/index.jsp

Duration : 2021. Oct. 29th ~ Nov. 2nd (5 days)

Youth Games

2016 Competition

The 2016 competition lasted for 1 week, featuring 2,400 martial artists from 81 countries competing in 17 martial arts. The martial art program consisted of: wrestling, judo, Jujutsu, kendo, kickboxing, muay thai, sambo, taekwondo, and wushu. The masterships events consisted of horseback archery, kabaddi, hapkido, kurash, taekkyeon, Tong-Il Moo-Do , yongmudo, and 'martial arts show' and 'martial arts contest' events.

Sports

 Belt Wrestling
 Horseback Archery
 Judo
 Ju-Jitsu
 Hapkido
 Kendo
 Kurash
 Kickboxing
 Muaythai

 Taekkyeon
 Taekwondo
 Yongmudo
 Sambo
 Tong-Il Moo-Do
 Wushu
 Martial Arts Record Contest
 Martial Arts Show

2016 Medals

2019 Competition

The 2019 championships were the second iteration of the masterships and featured 3,119 martial artists from 106 countries competing in 20 different martial arts areas over 275 medals. The motto was "Beyond the Times, Bridge the World".

The opening ceremony for the 2019 competition was held at Chungju Central Sports Stadium on August 30. It had 15,000 attendees and featured a performance from the Republic of Korea Air Force's Black Eagles aerobatic team. In total, 150,556 spectators and 900 volunteers were present during the entire duration of the masterships. Turkmenistan finished at first place with 19 medals, followed by South Korea with 17. The cost of the 2019 championships has been estimated to be 15 billion Korean won. Additionally, an international martial arts film festival featuring 51 different films was also held during the same period.

Aikido and savate were added and kickboxing and kendo were removed from the martial arts program. Pencak silat and ssireum were added to the masterships program.

Sports
List of Sports:

GAISF Events (85):

 Aikido (0)
 Belt Wrestling (12)
 Judo (5)
 Ju-Jitsu (12)
 Muaythai (10)
 Sambo (15)
 Savate (9)
 Taekwondo (6)
 Wushu (16)

Non GAISF Events (106):

 Horseback Archery (10)
 Korean Hapkido (9)
 Kabaddi (2)
 Kurash (15)
 Pencak silat (15) 
 Ssireum (8)
 Taekkyeon (8)
 Yongmudo (10)
 Tong-Il Moo-Do (12)
 Martial Arts Record Contest (9)
 Martial Arts Show (8)

2019 Medals (GAISF and Non GAISF)

2019 Medals (GAISF)

2019 Medals (Non GAISF)

2019 Individual medals (Non GAISF)

Tong-II Moo-Doo

Yongmudo

Kurash

Korean Hapkido

Kabaddi

Pencak Silat

Ssireum

Taekkyeon

Horseback Archery

Martial Arts Show

Martial Arts Record Contest

2017 Youth Competition

This games was held in 3-7 Nonember in 2017.

Sports
 Hapkido
 Kurash
 Muaythai
 Yongmudo
 Martial Arts Record Contest (RC)
 Martial Arts Show (MS)

Medals

2021 Online Games

Sports
http://online.mastership.org/en/schedule/ranking_event.jsp

GAISF Events (15):

 Judo (5)
 Muaythai (6)
 Taekwondo (4)

Non GAISF Events (42):

 e Martial Arts (0)
 Kendo (0)
 Korean Hapkido (5)
 Kurash (6)
 Taekkyeon (8)
 Yongmudo (8)
 Tong-Il Moo-Do (8)
 Martial Arts Show (7)

2021 Medals (GAISF and Non GAISF)
http://online.mastership.org/en/schedule/ranking_noc.jsp

See also
 World Combat Games
 Hyeong

References 

Martial arts competitions
2019 in South Korean sport
2016 in South Korean sport
Multi-sport events
Chungju
Cheongju